Callisthenia truncata is a moth of the subfamily Arctiinae. The type location is Colorado.

References

Lithosiini